Jessica Chaffin is an American actress, comedian, and writer best known as part of the comedy duo Ronna and Beverly with Jamie Denbo. She is also known for her recurring roles as Coco Wexler on Nickelodeon's Zoey 101, Marie Faldonado in the CBS sitcom Man with a Plan and appearing in the films Spy and The Heat. She starred as Beth in the NBC sitcom Abby's.

Early life
Chaffin was born and raised in Newton, Massachusetts. Her father is from a Jewish family, and her mother, who is of Scottish and English ancestry, converted to Judaism; Chaffin was raised Jewish. Her brother, Joshua Chaffin, is a writer for the Financial Times.

Career
She is a regular performer at the Upright Citizens Brigade Theatre in Los Angeles, often performing with her comedy partner Jamie Denbo. From 2005 to 2008, Chaffin was known for playing Coco Wexler, the girls' dorm adviser on all four seasons of the Nickelodeon series Zoey 101. From 2008 to 2009, she also worked with Amy Poehler as a writer and voice actor on the animated series The Mighty B! playing several roles, including that of Portia's cousin, Chelsea.  Then she popped up on various TV shows, including 90210, United States of Tara, New Girl, Man with a Plan, Veep, Episodes, and Search Party, and in the movies Spy, Pitch Perfect 3, and Fun Mom Dinner.

Chaffin has made guest appearances on television programs such as Weeds, Entourage, and Curb Your Enthusiasm. In December 2009, her comedy pilot Ronna & Beverly (based on the popular stage show she performs with Denbo at the Upright Citizens Brigade Theatre) aired on Showtime. Ronna & Beverly was eventually turned into a six-part comedy talk show, which was co-produced by Paul Feig and premiered on September 10, 2012 on Sky Atlantic HD in the United Kingdom. Together with Denbo, Chaffin created the Ronna and Beverly podcast.  A follow-up podcast, Ask Ronna, with Chaffin co-hosting with Bryan Safi was launched in 2019.

Chaffin was a series regular on the first season of CBS sitcom Man With A Plan and starred in the NBC sitcom Abby's.

Podcasts

Ronna and Beverly

Chaffin and comedy partner Jamie Denbo hosted a podcast, Ronna and Beverly, on the Earwolf network from 2011 until 2017 wherein they interviewed celebrity guests, interacted with one another, and dispensed advice to listeners.  Chaffin and Denbo developed their characters in 2006 when they were asked to host an all-Jewish 'Kosher Christmas Show' at the Upright Citizens Brigade Theatre.

Live performances from the pair were frequently advertised as "seminars" in which their characters discuss the fictional book they co-authored, "You'll Do a Little Better Next Time: A Guide to Marriage and Re-marriage for Jewish Singles."  After introducing the book, either Chaffin or Denbo would often add the clarification, "It says Jewish in the name, but it's for everyone!"

Episodes of their eponymous podcast were released every two weeks by Earwolf. Guests included people working in comedy, as well as actors, authors, and filmmakers.  The podcast premiered on May 25, 2011.  In episode 161 on June 15, 2017 (not long after they started teasing the possibility of releasing weekly episodes), Ronna and Beverly suddenly announced they were taking off "for the summer."  Since then, no new episodes have been released and the actresses have not appeared together in character.  Jessica Chaffin has kept Ronna alive by appearing in character as a guest on other podcasts and by maintaining an Instagram account.

Ask Ronna
In November, 2019, Chaffin and co-host Bryan Safi premiered a new podcast called Ask Ronna, in which Chaffin continues to appear as Ronna Glickman.  Safi and Chaffin's show focuses on requests for advice and questions from listeners, and often feature a celebrity guest.

Chaffin, as Glickman, is a purveyor of artisanal coffees in conjunction with the Ask Ronna podcast.

Filmography

References

External links
 

20th-century American actresses
21st-century American actresses
Actors from Newton, Massachusetts
Actresses from Massachusetts
American film actresses
American people of English descent
American people of Scottish descent
American women podcasters
American podcasters
American television actresses
American television writers
American voice actresses
American women comedians
Jewish American actresses
Jewish American female comedians
Living people
American women television writers
Year of birth missing (living people)
Writers from Newton, Massachusetts
Upright Citizens Brigade Theater performers
Screenwriters from Massachusetts
20th-century American comedians
21st-century American comedians
21st-century American Jews